Suspect is a 1987 American legal mystery thriller film directed by Peter Yates and starring Cher, Dennis Quaid, and Liam Neeson. Other notable cast members include John Mahoney, Joe Mantegna, Fred Melamed, and Philip Bosco.

Plot

Around Christmas, a United States Supreme Court Justice commits suicide, for which no explanation or context is given. Shortly thereafter, the body of Elizabeth Quinn, a file clerk at the Justice Department, is found floating in the Potomac River, and Carl Wayne Anderson (Liam Neeson), a homeless, deaf Vietnam veteran, is arrested for the crime, based almost entirely on the fact that he was seen sleeping in Quinn's car the night of her murder. Kathleen Riley (Cher) is the beleaguered D.C. public defender assigned to represent Anderson.

The car was abandoned in a desolate K Street parking lot. Anderson, it is eventually revealed, found the car unlocked and was looking for a warm place to sleep since it was the dead of winter. But since he was homeless, had no alibi, and was also found in possession of Quinn's wallet, he was arrested for her murder.

Riley finds it difficult to communicate with Anderson. Over time, she begins to penetrate his hard exterior and he tries to cooperate with her efforts to mount his defense.

Riley approves an agribusiness lobbyist who normally works on Capitol Hill, Eddie Sanger (Dennis Quaid), as a member of the jury despite his attempt to be excused. Sanger begins investigating the details of the murder, eventually teaming up with Riley beyond the observation of the trial's suspicious judge.

Sanger also keeps busy in his work as a lobbyist, including efforts to win passage of a bill by seducing a Congresswoman.

As Riley's investigation, with Sanger's unethical assistance, intensifies, they begin to focus on Deputy Attorney General Paul Gray (Philip Bosco). Figuring that a key found on the victim's body has something to do with the Justice Department (where Quinn worked), Riley and Sanger break into the file department there late one night and try to find what the key unlocks. They find a file cabinet containing trial transcripts from federal cases from 1968 that Quinn was in the process of transcribing.

The trial is conducted by the stern Judge Matthew Helms (John Mahoney). Helms is rumored to be the president's nominee for a seat on the prestigious United States Court of Appeals for the District of Columbia. He begins to suspect that Riley is collaborating with Sanger, which would be a disbarrable offense of jury tampering, but has no proof.

In a law library, Riley and Sanger narrowly avoid being caught by Helms, who sequesters the jury to avoid any possible further contact between them.

Riley and Sanger suspect that Quinn stumbled onto something and look for any case that might have an impropriety. Fixing a case requires the participation of both the prosecutor and the trial judge. Riley and Sanger think they will find evidence that Gray was the prosecutor on a rigged 1968 case, which would be his motive to murder Quinn if she approached him about what she found.

Riley goes back to Quinn's car (still impounded where it was found in a government parking lot) and finds an audiotape the police did not uncover in their half-hearted investigation. The tape is the one made by the Supreme Court justice who committed suicide. In it, he confesses to conspiring to fix a case in 1968 (with a politically influential defendant) in return for an appointment to the United States Court of Appeals for the District of Columbia Circuit.

Riley assumes Gray was the prosecutor on that case and goes back to the courthouse to retrieve the case book that will confirm it. She is pursued and attacked by a disguised, unidentified person. Sanger, having managed to escape sequestration by creating a diversion with a fire alarm, helps Riley, and she manages to slice the right wrist of her assailant, who then flees.

Gray shows up in the courtroom, to Judge Helms's surprise. Riley surprisingly announces that she wants Judge Helms to take the stand as a witness. An irate Helms says Riley cannot make him testify. Riley reveals that it was Helms, not Gray, who was the prosecutor in the fixed case of 1968. In exchange for fixing the case, Helms was nominated to the District Court. Seventeen years later, Quinn inadvertently discovered the case fixing. At the same time, Helms learned he was a likely nominee for the Court of Appeals. Quinn approached the Supreme Court justice, who responded by committing suicide. When she approached Helms, however, he murdered her. As the judge angrily bangs his gavel during Riley's accusation, his right wrist begins to bleed from where Riley slashed him the night before, confirming his identity as the killer.

Riley ends up reinvigorated in her job and in a relationship with Sanger.

Cast

 Cher - Kathleen Riley
 Dennis Quaid - Eddie Sanger
 Liam Neeson - Carl Wayne Anderson
 John Mahoney - Judge Matthew Bishop Helms
 Joe Mantegna - Charlie Stella
 Philip Bosco - Paul Gray
 E. Katherine Kerr - Grace Comisky
 Fred Melamed - Morty Rosenthal
 Bernie McInerney - Walter
 Bill Cobbs - Judge Franklin
 Richard Gant - Everett Bennett
 Paul D'Amato - Michael John Guthridge
 Thomas Barbour - Justice Lowell
 Katie O'Hare - Elizabeth Quinn 
 Jim Walton - Helms' Court Marshal
 Michael Beach - Parking Lot Attendant
 Ralph Cosham - Judge Assel Stewart
 Djanet Sears - Message Clerk

Reception
The film's climactic scene (in which the actual murderer is revealed) was panned by Roger Ebert, whose review noted that it is "as if an Agatha Christie novel evaluated six suspects in a British country house, and then in the last chapter we discover the killer was a guy from next door."

In the Los Angeles Times, film critic Sheila Benson wrote:As it speeds toward its finale, there are plot holes the size of Manhattan potholes, although it is refreshing to have so menacing a thriller with such a relatively low level of violence. And there isn’t a car chase from start to finish--amazing restraint from the director of Bullitt, and a positive point of pride these days. This is one to enjoy, but not to question too closely.
On review aggregator website Rotten Tomatoes, the film holds an approval rating of 67%, based on 18 reviews, and an average rating of 6.16/10. On Metacritic — which assigns a weighted mean score — the film has a score of 53 out of 100 based on 13 critics, indicating "mixed or average reviews". Audiences polled by CinemaScore gave the film an average grade of "B+" on an A+ to F scale.

See also
 List of films featuring the deaf and hard of hearing

References

External links
 
 
 
 
 
 

1987 films
1987 drama films
1980s crime drama films
1980s legal films
American courtroom films
American mystery films
Films about deaf people
Films about homelessness
Films about lawyers
Films directed by Peter Yates
Films with screenplays by Eric Roth
Films scored by Michael Kamen
Films set in Washington, D.C.
Films shot in Toronto
Films shot in Washington, D.C.
Legal thriller films
TriStar Pictures films
1980s English-language films
1980s American films